Game On is the debut EP by Canadian country music ensemble James Barker Band, released on April 21, 2017. All four of the singles released from the record have reached the top 10 at Canadian country radio, including one number one hit with "Chills". Upon its release, Game On debuted at number 29 on the Canadian Albums Chart.

Singles
The group's debut single, "Lawn Chair Lazy", was released May 6, 2016. By peaking at number three on the Canada Country chart, the song became the highest-charting debut single by a Canadian country artist.

"Just Sayin'" was released in October 2016 as the second single off what would become Game On. It also reached the top 10.

"Chills" was released as the third single on March 3, 2017. The song became the group's first to chart on the Canadian Hot 100, reaching a peak of 91. It reached number one on the Canadian country chart, making the James Barker Band the first Canadian act to produce a number one radio single from a debut album. "Chills" was later released to American country radio on October 23, 2017, as their debut radio single in that country.

The EP's fourth single, "It's Working", was released in August 2017. It earned the group their fourth consecutive top 10 single.

Critical reception
Annie Reuter of Sounds Like Nashville wrote that the EP "showcases both their fun and sentimental sides," and that songs like "Chills" help "solidify the band's staying power."

Track listing

Charts

EP

Singles

Certifications

Awards and nominations

References

2017 debut EPs
Juno Award for Country Album of the Year albums
James Barker Band albums
Universal Music Canada albums
Albums produced by Todd Clark